Felix M. Anthony is a Fiji Indian trade unionist and politician.

During the 2000 coup, he was illegally detained by members of the Taukei Movement, an ethnic Fijian extremist organisation.

He was appointed to the Senate in 2002 as one of eight nominees of the Leader of the Opposition.

Anthony is National Secretary of the Fiji Trades Union Congress (FTUC).  He was reelected as General Secretary of the Fiji Sugar and General Workers Union on 11 March 2006.

In the parliamentary election held on 6–13 May 2006, Anthony was elected to the House of Representatives seat, representing the Vuda Open Constituency for the Fiji Labour Party (FLP).  After his election, he was involved in a dispute with the FLP leader, Mahendra Chaudhry, over the way in which Chaudhry had chosen his Senate nominees.

After the 2006 military coup by Frank Bainimarama, Anthony was appointed to the Board of Fiji National Provident Fund (FNPF) and the Board of Telecom Fiji.

As head of FTUC, Anthony helped establish the People's Democratic Party, and in May 2014 he was elected party leader. Following the PDP's failure to win any seats in the 2014 election, he stepped down as leader, and was replaced by Adi Sivia Qoro.

References 

Year of birth missing (living people)
Living people
Fiji Labour Party politicians
Fijian trade unionists
Indian members of the House of Representatives (Fiji)
Indian members of the Senate (Fiji)
People's Democratic Party (Fiji) politicians
Fijian Christians